Iteradensovirus is a genus of viruses in the subfamily Densovirinae of the family Parvoviridae. Insects serve as natural hosts. There are five species in this genus.

Taxonomy
The following five species are assigned to the genus:

Lepidopteran iteradensovirus 1
Lepidopteran iteradensovirus 2
Lepidopteran iteradensovirus 3
Lepidopteran iteradensovirus 4
Lepidopteran iteradensovirus 5

Structure
Viruses in Iteradensovirus are non-enveloped, with icosahedral and  Round geometries, and T=1 symmetry. The diameter is around 21-22 nm. Genomes are linear, around 5kb in length.

Life cycle
Viral replication is nuclear. Entry into the host cell is achieved by attachment to host receptors, which mediates clathrin-mediated endocytosis. Replication follows the rolling-hairpin model. DNA templated transcription, with some alternative splicing mechanism is the method of transcription. 
Insects serve as the natural host.

References

External links
 Viralzone: Iteradensovirus
  ICTV Iteradensovirus

Densovirinae
Virus genera